Alan Kitching RDI AGI Hon FRCA (born 1940), is a practitioner of letterpress typographic design and printmaking. Kitching exhibits and lectures across the globe, and is known for his expressive use of wood and metal letterforms in commissions and limited-edition prints.

Early life
Born 1940 in Darlington, Co. Durham, he was an apprentice compositor (1956–61). From 1962 to 1964 he was a technician in hand and line type composition, Department of Printing, Watford College of Technology, Herts. After meeting Anthony Froshaug (the new head of department) Kitching co-established the experimental printing workshop at Watford College of Technology. Kitching later continued to collaborate with Froshaug on student projects at the Central School of Art & Design.

Professional career
In 1973 Alan began his own design practice in London with Colin Forbes. In 1977 he partnered with Derek Birdsall and Martin Lee at Omnific and started letterpress printing there in 1985. He began letterpress workshops in 1986 at Omnific Studios, Islington, London. He then went on to establish The Typography Workshop in Clerkenwell (1989). From 1994 he worked in partnership with designer/writer Celia Stothard (later his wife). In 1999, in partnership with designer and teacher, Celia Stothard FRSA, Kitching purchased a large collection of theatrical wood types, now named, 'Entertaining Types' and housed in Kennington, Lambeth, South London.

Teaching
1967–70: Part-Time lecturer in Typography, School of Art, Watford College. 
 of Technology, Herts.
 1968–72: Visiting lecturer in Graphic Design, Central School of Art & Design, London.
 1973: Visiting lecturer, London College of Printing.
 1974.75: Visiting lecturer, Goldsmiths College, University of London.
 1988: Visiting lecturer in Graphic Design, Royal College of Art
 1990-2000: University of Brighton, School of Graphic Design, visiting
 lecturer.
 1991–2006: Typography Workshops at Royal College of Art
 1994: Colchester Institute, School of Art, visiting lecturer.
 1993-1995: Glasgow School of Art, visiting lecturer.

Awards and Membership of professional bodies
 Designers and Art Directors Association (D and AD) 
1999: Fellow of Chartered Society of Designers 
 1999: Member of Alliance Graphique Internationale (AGI) 
 1994: Royal Designer for Industry (RDI) 
 1996: Member of the Designers and Art Directors Association (D&AD) 1997: Fellow of Royal Society of Arts
 1998: Fellow of the Royal College of Art
 2001: Visiting Professor The London Institute (now University of the Arts London)

Commissions
 1999: Stamps for Royal Mail: Magna Carta Millennium series 
 2002: Poems on the buses for Transport for London
 2002: Posters for the National Theatre's Transformation season of plays
 2002: Stamps for the Royal Mail: Love Occasion series
 2001/2003: Typographic artwork for The Guardian Newspaper
 2003: Typographic artworks for VSO poster campaign 'We need professionals'
 2003: Typographic mural for The Guardian Newspaper building reception

Exhibitions
1992: Gallery at Pentagram, SOLO SHOW 
 1993: Royal College of Art, SOLO SHOW
 1994: Crafts Council 'True to Type', 5 works, catalogue, 
 1994: D&AD "Festival of Excellence', 4 works
 1994: Paperpoint shop, several works
 1996: '20 Designers for a Silhouette', Centre Pompidou, Paris
 1996: Royal Mail Stamps, London
 1997: 'British Graphic Design', Cologne, Germany
 1997: The Gallery at Pentagram, London
 1998: Coningsby Gallery SOLO SHOW
 2000: 'Powerhouse', UK
 2001: Gallery at Pentagram, 'In Darkest England'
 1998: The British Pavilion, 'Information expertise @ UK'; The Library and Information Commission, Amsterdam
 1999: 'A K TypeArt 98', The Coningsby Gallery, London, one man show
 2002: Gallery at Pentagram, London, one man show
 2004: Public Address System, London and Berlin
 2004: Pax Britannica, London Advanced Graphics London
 2016: Somerset House 
 2016: Suffolk
 2016: The Lighthouse, Glasgow

Talks and conferences
 1994: icograda, London
 1995: icograda, Lisbon
 1995: AGI (Alliance Graphique Internationale), Amalfi, Italy
 1997: AGI (Alliance Graphique Internationale), Barcelona, Spain
 1998: A Typ.1, Lyon, France
 2002: University of NSW Sydney & AGI Ideas Melbourne Australia
 2002: AGI (Alliance Graphique Internationale), Zurich/Pontresina,  Switzerland
 2003: Typo3 Johannesburg SA
 2004: London College of Communication 23/6/04
 2004: Forum Laus, Barcelona May 2004
 2005: AGI (Alliance Graphique Internationale), Berlin

Guest lectures / Workshops
 1999-2000: Hereford - College of Art
 2000: Rotterdam - Willem de Kooning Academie
 2002: Copenhagen - I T University
 2004: D&AD Workout
 2004: University of Delaware 
 2015: Workshop, Tipoteca, Italy Books on Alan Kitching or featuring work
 1966: 'Frontiers of Printmaking', Michael Rothenstein, Library of Congress 66-24551
 1974 Printed in Watford, Watford School of Art, Herts.
 1993: The Sixties, David Mellor 
 1994: D&AD Annual
 1995: D&AD Annual
 1996 D&AD Annual
 1996: 'G1 subj: contemp, design, graphic, 
 1996: 'A Double Life of 80 AGI designers .....' Armando Milani/Burgo
 1997 'First Choice', Ken Cato, ISBN
 1999: Royal Mail Millennium Stamps 
 1999: New Design: London, The Edge of Graphic Design, Ed. E.M.Gomez, Rockport, USA,  D&AD Annual
 2001: Master of the 20th Century, Ed. Mervyn Kurlansky/Icograda, Graphis, New York 
 2000: Anthony Froshaug: Typography & Texts (2 vols), Robin Kinross 
 2002: Helvetica – Homage to a Typeface, Lars Müller, Switzerland 
 2003: Creative Island, John Sorrell, Lawrence King, 
 2002: The Graphics Book, D&AD, Rotovision, 
 2003: The Thames & Hudson Dictionary of Graphic Design and Designers
 2015: A-Z in Letterpress, Laurence King, London, 
 2016: A Life in Letterpress, Laurence King, London

Bibliography
1970: 'Typography Manual', School of Art, Watford College of Technology

2016. 'A life in Letterpress, Laurence King, London.

References 

1940 births
Living people
British typographers and type designers